Dieter Werkmüller (11 July 1937 – 24 October 2022) was a German academic and lawyer.

Biography
Werkmüller studied law at Ludwig Maximilian University of Munich and Goethe University Frankfurt. He completed his first state examination in 1962 and his second in 1966. He then worked as a research assistant in Frankfurt before moving to the University of Marburg. He completed his doctorate in 1970 with a legal history work on Weisthümer.

Two years later, Werkmüller was appointed chair of legal history and civil law at Marburg, where he taught and researched until his retirement in 2002. He then worked at a law firm alongside  until 2006, while continuing to hold lectures on legal history at Marburg until that same year.

Werkmüller's research focused on German legal history. He achieved great notoriety thanks to his work, written alongside , Ekkehard Kaufmann, and Wolfgang Stammler.

Werkmüller died in Kirchhain on 24 October 2022, at the age of 85.

References

1937 births
2022 deaths
German academics
German lawyers
Legal historians
Academic staff of the University of Marburg
People from Wiesbaden